Opus Dei is the third studio album by Slovenian band Laibach, released in 1987. It features "Geburt einer Nation" ("birth of a nation"), a German language cover version of Queen's "One Vision", and two reworkings of the Austrian band Opus' sole international hit single "Live Is Life". The Opus song became the German language "Leben heißt Leben" and the English language "Opus Dei". "The Great Seal" is the national anthem of the NSK State, the lyrics taken from Churchill's "We shall fight on the beaches" speech. A new arrangement of the song appears on Laibach's album Volk, with the title "NSK". On Volk, the song is credited to Laibach and Slavko Avsenik, Jr.

There are two further connections with Queen's A Kind of Magic album. Although the drum loop in "Trans-National" is nearly identical to that in Queen's "Don't Lose Your Head", it is composed in fact from samples from the introduction musical theme from the movie Battle of Neretva, composed by Bernard Herrmann. The elements of "How the West Was Won" (specifically the rhythm and harmonised guitars) are inspired by Queen's "Gimme the Prize".

The attention this album received from MTV and others led to Laibach's first worldwide tour. The album was included in the book 1001 Albums You Must Hear Before You Die.

Track listing
 "Leben heißt Leben" (Live Is Life) (Opus) – 5:28
 "Geburt einer Nation" (Birth of a Nation) (Queen) – 4:22
 "Leben - Tod" (Life - Death) (Laibach) – 3:58
 "F.I.A.T." (Laibach) – 5:13
 "Opus Dei" (Opus) – 5:04
 "Trans-National" (Laibach) – 4:28
 "How the West Was Won" (Laibach) – 4:26
 "The Great Seal" (Laibach) – 4:16

+ On CD editions, 4 tracks from "Baptism":
 "Herz-Felde" (Heartfield) (Laibach) – 4:46
 "Jägerspiel" (Hunters' Game) (Laibach) – 7:23
 "Koža" (Skin) (Laibach) – 3:51
 "Krst" (Baptism) (Laibach) – 5:39

References

External links

Opus Dei (Adobe Flash) at Radio3Net (streamed copy where licensed)

1987 albums
Laibach (band) albums
Mute Records albums